The Casarsa–Portogruaro railway is a railway line in Italy. It was opened on 19 August 1888.

See also 
 List of railway lines in Italy

References

Footnotes

Sources
 
 
 

Railway lines in Friuli-Venezia Giulia
Railway lines in Veneto
Railway lines opened in 1888